Charles Hans (9 August 1892 – 2 January 1951) was a French racing cyclist. He rode in the 1921 Tour de France.

References

1892 births
1951 deaths
French male cyclists
Place of birth missing